AX (Architecture eXtended) was a Japanese computing initiative starting in around 1986 to allow PCs to handle double-byte (DBCS) Japanese text via special hardware chips, whilst allowing compatibility with software written for foreign IBM PCs. The idea was conceived by Kazuhiko Nishi before he resigned his position as vice president of Microsoft.

Microsoft Japan took over the project, and in July 1987 the Preparatory Committee of the AX Consortium started developing its specification. The AX Consortium officially started in October 1987, including ASCII Corporation, Sony, Hitachi, Sharp, Oki, Casio, Canon, Kyocera, Sanyo, Mitsubishi Electric, etc., but notably excluding Toshiba and Fujitsu (who were hence the 'opposition'). At that time, NEC PC-9801 was the dominant PC architecture in the Japanese PC market because IBM PC/AT and its clone PCs could not display Japanese text. However, NEC did not tolerate PC-9801 compatible machines and was fighting court battles with Epson which was the only PC-9801 compatible machine vendor. Therefore, other vendors desperately needed a standard specification for Japanese capable PCs.

JEGA 
To display Kanji characters with sufficient clarity, AX machines had  screens with a resolution of 640x480 rather than the 640x350 standard EGA resolution prevalent elsewhere at the time. JEGA was developed jointly by ASCII and Chips & Technologies, combining the P82C435 and V6367 video chips. Users could typically switch between Japanese and English modes by typing 'JP' and 'US', which would also invoke the AX-BIOS and an IME enabling the input of Japanese characters.

In addition to the display modes supported by EGA, JEGA supports the following modes as standard:

 Text 80 characters x 25 lines, effective resolution 640 x 480 pixels, 8 pages (overwrite mode 3h of EGA);
 Text 80 characters x 25 lines, effective resolution 640 x 480 pixels, 8 pages, graphic screen and overlaid display (overwrite mode 2h of EGA);
 Graphics 640 x 480 pixels, 1 page;
 Graphics 640 x 480 pixels, 1 page, overlaid with text screen.

AX-VGA 
However, soon after the release of the AX, IBM released the VGA standard with which AX was obviously not compatible (they were not the only one promoting non-standard "super EGA" extensions). Consequently, the AX consortium had to design a compatible . AX-VGA/H was a hardware implementation with AX-BIOS, whereas AX-VGA/S was a software emulation. Development of the AX-VGA chipset was delayed, and its first implementation came out in 1991.

Due to less available software and its higher cost compared to the PC-9801 series, AX failed and was not able to break into the market in Japan. The Nikkei Personal Computing journal reported in 1989 that only 18 out of 36,165 PCs used in 937 companies were AX machines, and 90% of companies had no plan to purchase the AX machine.

In 1990, IBM Japan unveiled DOS/V which enabled IBM PC/AT and its clones to display Japanese text without any additional hardware using a standard VGA card. Soon after, AX disappeared and the decline of NEC PC-9801 began.

See also
DOS
DOS/V
Shift JIS
PC Open Architecture Developers' Group (OADG)

References

Further reading

External links
 Mitsubishi Maxy (information from a Japanese computer museum)
 Oki if386AX (information from a Japanese computer museum)

Graphics hardware
Computer-related introductions in 1986